Handbuck Eyot or Handbuck Ait is a thin, wooded island in the River Thames in England towards the eastern edge of the villages of Shiplake, Oxfordshire. It is on the reach above Marsh Lock.

Description
The island is wooded and only accessible by boat. It has been included in the property of five to seven detached houses against the river in Bolney Road, Shiplake which it faces.

See also

Islands in the River Thames

Islands of Oxfordshire
Islands of Berkshire
Islands of the River Thames